Joan Wadleigh Curran (born 1950) is an American visual artist, painter, and printmaker based in Philadelphia, known primarily for her figurative paintings and drawings in which she addresses the intersection of the natural world and human intervention. Between 2001 and 2016, Curran served as Senior Lecturer in Painting and Drawing at the University of Pennsylvania.

Life and work 
Born in Paterson, New Jersey, Curran received a B.S. in art from Skidmore College in 1972 and her M.F.A. from Yale University in 1974. In 1974, she began teaching studio art at LaGrange College in Troup County, Georgia, where she worked until 1977. When discussing her own work, the artist explained that painting provides her "with an opportunity to connect to the physical world," allowing her in turn to understand "the relationship between the tangible presence of real objects and their ability to trigger an intangible response." According to the art critic Adriana Rabinovitch, Curran "anthropomorphizes what we call garbage in a manner that spurs a deeper investigation into the cycle of life of an object."Throughout her career, Curran received grants from the Independence Foundation, the Pennsylvania Council for the Arts, and was twice a finalist in the Pew Fellowship for the Arts. In 2017, Curran completed a residency at the Civitella Ranieri Foundation in Umbria, Italy, where she created a series of gouache paintings and drawings inspired by the natural environment and the physical surroundings of the foundation's 15th-century castle, some of which were later exhibited in Curran's solo show titled Instability at InLiquid Gallery in Philadelphia in 2019. She was also the recipient of the 2018 Awagami Print Award by the The Print Center in Philadelphia.

Exhibitions and collections 
Curran has held solo exhibitions at the Lamar Dodd Art Center in LaGrange, West Georgia College (now University of West Georgia) in Carrollton, Callaway Gardens in Pine Mountain, and Seraphin Gallery in Philadelphia, among other venues in the United States. Her work is included in permanent collections of multiple American institutions, including the Columbus Museum in Columbus, Georgia, the High Museum of Art in Atlanta, the New Jersey State Museum in Trenton, the Woodmere Art Museum in Philadelphia, the Lamar Dodd Art Center, Georgia State Art Collection, and the Pennsylvania Convention Center Art Collection.

References 

1950 births
Living people
American women painters
Painters from Pennsylvania
20th-century American painters
21st-century American painters
University of Pennsylvania faculty
Painters from New Jersey
People from Paterson, New Jersey